Corgi may refer to:

 Welsh Corgi, a type of herding dog
 Pembroke Welsh Corgi
 Cardigan Welsh Corgi

Manufacturing
 Corgi Toys, a range of die-cast toys created by the Mettoy company; or associated brands:
 Corgi International, a company that manufactures movie prop replicas, die-cast collectibles, and gift and toy products
 Corgi Classics, a die-cast model manufacturer
 Corgi Motorcycle Co Ltd., a British motorcycle manufacturer
 Corgi Socks, a Welsh manufacturer of luxury socks and knitwear

Other uses
 Corgi (publisher), a United Kingdom imprint of the publishing company Random House
 Council for Registered Gas Installers (CORGI), a voluntary registration scheme for gas installers in the UK

See also
 Korgi (disambiguation)
 The Korgis